George Finidi (born 15 April 1971), known as Finidi George, is a Nigerian professional football coach and former player who is currently the head coach of Nigeria Professional Football League club Enyimba F.C. As a player, he played as a right winger.

After making a name for himself at Ajax in the Netherlands – being a leading figure in a team which won eight major titles, including the 1995 Champions League – he played several years in Spain with Real Betis, also having a brief spell in England before retiring.

Finidi was an important member of the Nigeria team during the 1990s, appearing in two World Cups.

Finidi played throughout his footballing career for Nigeria with his iconic number 7 jersey.

In September 2021, Enyimba F.C. named Finidi as their new head coach.

Club career

Ajax 
Born in Port Harcourt, Finidi played for three clubs in his country. In 1993, he arrived at AFC Ajax alongside compatriot Nwankwo Kanu. His impact with the Amsterdam side was immediate as he scored four goals in 27 games to help them win the Eredivisie title, which was also achieved in the following two seasons; additionally, as a starter, he appeared in consecutive UEFA Champions League finals, winning the 1994–95 edition against A.C. Milan.

Real Betis 
On 10 July 1996, Finidi moved to Spain and signed with Real Betis for 1,024 million pesetas, where he netted in three digits in nearly every season, with the Andalusians finishing fourth in his first year, which also brought a Copa del Rey final loss to FC Barcelona (2–3 after extra time), where he scored; before joining the club he was close to moving to Real Madrid, but the deal fell through.

Mallorca and Ipswich Town 
After Betis' relegation from the top flight in 2000, Finidi stayed one more year in Spain with RCD Mallorca, after which he joined Premier League team Ipswich Town, managed by George Burley, for £3.1 million. He scored twice in a 3–1 victory over Derby County at Portman Road but underperformed overall, with them also suffering relegation; he was released from contract in June 2003.

In November 2003, the 32-year-old Finidi underwent a trial at former club Mallorca, following which he signed with the Balearic Islands team, helping them finally finish in 11th position after constantly battling relegation. He retired from the game in the summer.

In mid-November 2010, Finidi returned to Betis as its director of international football. He continued, however, to live in Palma, Majorca, where he had relocated to after his retirement.

International career
Finidi made his debut for Nigeria in 1991, in an Africa Cup of Nations qualifier against Burkina Faso, providing three assists for Rashidi Yekini and scoring once in a 7–1 rout. He helped the national team win the 1994 edition of the tournament in Tunisia, and also achieved one second and two third-place finishes.

Finidi represented Nigeria in two FIFA World Cups, 1994 and 1998. In the former, held in the United States, as the national team won their group and exited in the round of 16 against eventual finalists Italy, he scored against Greece in a 2–0 win, proceeding to mimick a urinating dog whilst celebrating.

In the 1998 tournament in France, Finidi also played in all the matches, with Nigeria meeting the same fate at the hands of Denmark. He had already vowed to quit international football prior to the competition, and earned a total of 62 caps.

Style of play
Considered to be one of Nigeria's greatest wingers, Finidi was a physically strong and tall player who was known for his deceptively rapid pace, accurate crosses and efficient dribbles. He was also known for his accurate free kicks. Finidi was not only known for his technical abilities, but he also possessed a unique footballing brain. dribbling skills.

Personal life
The name Finidi translates into English as "a future full of sun". Two of his 11 brothers, Igeniwari and Celestine, were also footballers, and the former was killed during crowd problems in a match.

Honours

Club
Ajax
Eredivisie: 1993–94, 1994–95, 1995–96
Johan Cruijff Shield: 1994, 1995
UEFA Champions League: 1994–95; Runner-up 1995–96
UEFA Super Cup: 1995
Intercontinental Cup: 1995

Betis
Copa del Rey runner-up: 1996–97

International
Nigeria
Africa Cup of Nations: 1994; Runner-up 2000; Third place 1992, 2002

References

External links
Beijen profile 

Betisweb stats and bio 

1971 births
Living people
People from Diobu, Port Harcourt
Sportspeople from Port Harcourt
Nigerian footballers
Association football wingers
Nigeria Professional Football League players
Heartland F.C. players
Eredivisie players
AFC Ajax players
La Liga players
Real Betis players
RCD Mallorca players
Premier League players
English Football League players
Ipswich Town F.C. players
UEFA Champions League winning players
Nigeria international footballers
1994 FIFA World Cup players
1998 FIFA World Cup players
1992 African Cup of Nations players
1994 African Cup of Nations players
2000 African Cup of Nations players
2002 African Cup of Nations players
Africa Cup of Nations-winning players
Nigerian expatriate footballers
Expatriate footballers in the Netherlands
Expatriate footballers in Spain
Expatriate footballers in England
Nigerian expatriate sportspeople in the Netherlands
Nigerian expatriate sportspeople in Spain
Nigerian expatriate sportspeople in England
PEC Zwolle non-playing staff